P98 may refer to:

 , a patrol boat of the Royal Australian Navy
 Papyrus 98, a biblical manuscript
 P98, a state regional road in Latvia